Maailman Kuvalehti (Finnish: World's Pictorial Magazine) is a magazine which was published by KEPA, an umbrella organization of non-governmental organizations in Finland. The print version of the magazine is published by Fingo which is the successor of the KEPA, four times a year.

History and profile
Maailman Kuvalehti is published by Fingo in Finnish and focuses on global issues. More specifically, the magazine contains articles about daily life in developing countries and multicultural Finland. Major aim of the magazine is to improve awareness on developing countries. In the 2006 survey of the publisher it was founded that the readers were mostly positive about the stories on environmental issues, human rights and local cultures. 

Maailman Kuvalehti was formerly known as Kumppani. The name was changed to Maailman Kuvalehti Kumppani (Finnish: World’s Pictorial Magazine Kumppani) in 2009. It was further reported by KEPA that "Kumppani" would be eliminated from the title. It was previously published six times per year.

See also
 List of magazines in Finland

References

External links

Bi-monthly magazines published in Finland
Finnish-language magazines
Magazines established in 1985
Magazines published in Helsinki
Political magazines published in Finland